PhytoKeys is a peer-reviewed, open-access online and print botanical journal. Its stated goal is "to support free exchange of ideas and information in systematic botany".

Printed issues of the journal are available in the libraries of the United States (Smithsonian Institution, Missouri Botanical Garden), United Kingdom (Natural History Museum, London, Royal Botanic Gardens, Kew), Russia (Komarov Botanical Institute, St. Petersburg) and China (Kunming Institute of Botany, Kunming).

Important Articles
Feb, 2015: The discovery of Thismia hongkongensis.
Apr, 2022: The rediscovery of Gasteranthus extinctus.

References

External links

All PhytoKeys issues

Botany journals
Open access journals
Pensoft Publishers academic journals
Continuous journals